Electric scooter may refer to:

 Electric motorcycles and scooters
 Mobility scooter
 Motorized scooter (kick scooter)